Karns City is a borough in Butler County, Pennsylvania, United States. The population was 209 at the 2010 census.

Geography
Pennsylvania Route 268 passes through the borough, leading north  to Petrolia and south  to Chicora.

Demographics

As of the census of 2000, there were 244 people, 89 households, and 67 families residing in the borough. The population density was 645.8 people per square mile (247.9/km2). There were 96 housing units at an average density of 254.1 per square mile (97.5/km2). The racial makeup of the borough was 99.59% White and 0.41% African American. Hispanic or Latino of any race were 0.41% of the population.

There were 89 households, out of which 33.7% had children under the age of 18 living with them, 62.9% were married couples living together, 7.9% had a female householder with no husband present, and 23.6% were non-families. 16.9% of all households were made up of individuals, and 12.4% had someone living alone who was 65 years of age or older. The average household size was 2.74 and the average family size was 3.10.

In the borough the population was spread out, with 26.6% under the age of 18, 6.6% from 18 to 24, 28.3% from 25 to 44, 21.7% from 45 to 64, and 16.8% who were 65 years of age or older. The median age was 36 years. For every 100 females there were 89.1 males. For every 100 females age 18 and over, there were 82.7 males.

The median income for a household in the borough was $32,125, and the median income for a family was $34,375. Males had a median income of $36,750 versus $21,042 for females. The per capita income for the borough was $15,290. About 12.5% of families and 16.7% of the population were below the poverty line, including 22.6% of those under the age of eighteen and 13.6% of those sixty five or over.

Education
Karns City Area School District
Karns City High School

References

External links
 Karns City Area School District

Populated places established in 1874
Boroughs in Butler County, Pennsylvania
1874 establishments in Pennsylvania